Christiano Mendy (born 4 June 1991) is a Senegalese professional footballer who plays as a striker for Greek Football League club Diagoras.

References

External links

1991 births
Living people
Senegalese footballers
Senegalese expatriate footballers
Association football forwards
Vyzas F.C. players
Diagoras F.C. players